Sd.Kfz. 247 (Sonderkraftfahrzeug 247) was an armored car used by the German armed forces during World War II. 

Before the war, ten six-wheeled models (Ausf. A) were built; this was followed during the war by 58 four-wheeled models (Ausf. B).

Description
The Sd.Kfz. 247 had an open-topped, thinly armored body mounted on a wheeled chassis. It was unarmed as its six-man crew was not intended to fight; rather, it was intended for use by the commanders of motorcycle and motorized reconnaissance battalions, although neither version was fitted with any radios. Photographic evidence shows some Ausf. B vehicles were retro-fitted with a star-shaped radio antenna mounted inside the crew compartment, and an additional armor plate bolted to the lower glacis of the hull.

Ausf. A
Krupp built ten Ausf. A models on the chassis of its six-wheel "Krupp Protze" truck in 1937.

Like all of the other vehicles that used this chassis, the Ausf. A had very limited cross-country mobility, drivers being advised to stay on roads and trails.

Ausf. B
Daimler-Benz built 58 of these in 1941—1942 on a four-wheel drive heavy car chassis (s.Pkw. Typ 1c).

Armour

References

Sources

External links
Replika Sd.Kfz. 247B
World War II vehicles
Panzers of the Reich
Photo gallery of a Sd.Kfz. 247 Ausf. B 
detailed data for the Ausf. A

World War II armoured fighting vehicles of Germany
Armoured cars of the interwar period
Military vehicles introduced in the 1930s
Wheeled armoured personnel carriers
SPGs. SPAs. Armored cars and trucks of 1937